Events from the year 1879 in art.

Events
 April 10–May 11 – Fourth Impressionist exhibition in Paris, arranged by Gustave Caillebotte at 28 avenue de l'Opéra. 
Ford Madox Brown begins painting The Manchester Murals in Manchester Town Hall (England).
Chicago Academy of Fine Arts established.
Guimet Museum of Asian art established in Lyon, France.
Museum of Fine Arts Berne established in Switzerland.
Kate Greenaway's first book, with her own colour illustrations, Under the Window: Pictures & Rhymes for Children, is published in London.

Works

 Michael Ancher – Vil han klare pynten (Will he round the point)
 Albert Fitch Bellows – The Parsonage
 William-Adolphe Bouguereau – The Birth of Venus
 William Burges – Golden Bed
 Edward Burne-Jones – The Annunciation
 Edgar Degas
 The Dance Lesson (approximate date)
 Miss La La at the Cirque Fernando
 Portrait of Henri Michel-Lévy in his studio
 Portraits at the Stock Exchange
 Gustave Achille Guillaumet – Laghouat in the Algerian Sahara
 Ivan Kramskoi – Mikhail Saltykov-Shchedrin
 George Dunlop Leslie – Alice in Wonderland
 Édouard Manet
 The Café-Concert
 Self-Portrait with Palette
 In the Conservatory
 John Everett Millais
 Cherry Ripe
 Louise Jopling
 Albert Joseph Moore – Topaz
 Vasily Perov – Pugachev's Judgement
 Pierre-Auguste Renoir – The Dreamer
 John Singer Sargent
 In the Luxembourg Gardens (Luxembourg Gardens at Twilight)
 Portrait of Carolus-Duran
 Charlotte Schreiber – The Croppy Boy (The Confession of an Irish Patriot)
 James Tissot – Mrs. Newton with a Parasol (approximate date)

Births
January 13 – William Reid Dick, Scottish sculptor (died 1961)
March 27 – Edward Steichen, American photographer, painter, and art gallery and museum curator (died 1973)
June 4 – Mabel Lucie Attwell, English illustrator (died 1964)
July 26 – Maria Bal, Polish model (died 1955)
September 23 – Charles Camoin, French painter (died 1965)
October 22 – Sir Matthew Smith, English painter (died 1959)
November 18 – Sybil Pye, English bookbinder (died 1958)
December 18 – Paul Klee, Swiss painter (died 1940)

Deaths
January 26 – Julia Margaret Cameron, British photographer in Ceylon (born 1815)
February 10 – Honoré Daumier, French painter, sculptor and caricaturist (born 1808)
March 21 – Valentine Bartholomew, English flower painter (born 1799)
March 27 – Hércules Florence, French-born Brazilian painter and pioneer photographer (born 1817)
March 30 – Thomas Couture, French painter and art teacher (born 1815)
May 8 – Henry Collen, English royal miniature portrait painter (born 1797)
June 24 – Eliseo Sala, Italian painter (born 1813)
July 7 – George Caleb Bingham, American realist artist (born 1811)
July 16 – Frederick Langenheim, German American pioneer of panoramic photography (born 1809)
July 17 – Maurycy Gottlieb, Polish Jewish painter (born 1804)
August 3 – Joseph Severn, English portrait and subject painter (born 1793)
September 5 – Camille Doncieux, French first wife and model of Claude Monet (born 1847)
September 6 – Amédée de Noé, French caricaturist (born 1818)
September 8 – William Morris Hunt, American painter (born 1824)
November 2 – Abbondio Sangiorgio, Italian sculptor (born 1798)
November 18 – André Giroux, French painter and photographer (born 1801)
December 1 – Franz Ittenbach, German religious painter (born 1813)
Chō Kōran, Japanese poet and nanga artist (born 1804)

References

 
Years of the 19th century in art
1870s in art